Quel is a village in the province and autonomous community of La Rioja, Spain.

Quel is known for its castle, which overlooks the town from atop a steep hill. The village's name is derived from the Arabic قَلْعَة (qalat), meaning "castle" or "fortress."

References

Populated places in La Rioja (Spain)